Lost and Found is the third studio album by American heavy metal band Mudvayne. The album was released on April 12, 2005. The album had major success in the U.S., debuting at number 2 and being certified gold by the RIAA shortly afterward. It has sold about 1,000,000 copies as of August 2014 and is the band's most successful album to date.

Production
After opening for Metallica on the band's Summer Sanitarium tour in 2003, Mudvayne spent the holidays recuperating before starting work on the album. The album was produced by Dave Fortman. The band chose Fortman because they felt he could combine the band's extreme elements.

Before heading to The Plant Studios in Sausalito, California to record the album, the band spent time with Fortman in pre-production. Vocalist Chad Gray said "I've found that those first few days are the most important when it comes to setting the album's tone and challenging the band about their goals and fine-tuning the arrangements for maximum emotional impact." The band rented a ranch in Northern California where they wrote and rehearsed songs for the album. They converted its multi-stall garage into a makeshift studio. As with the band's previous album, Mudvayne chose to isolate themselves to provide inspiration for their songwriting. Matthew McDonough stated "Establishing clear goals for each song has been the key to Mudvayne's quick results. It's a strange contradiction, but it can be very liberating to set limitations on creativity as long as you don't let those limitations define you. It frees up a lot of creative energy when you stop pulling an idea in fifty different directions and start pushing it in one."

By May 27, 2004, the band had finished writing 12 songs for the album. Chad, Ryan, Greg and Matthew left the ranch in Santa Cruz and went back to their respective homes in California, Illinois and Wisconsin. On June 12, 2004, the band reconvened to commence recording the album.

The song "Small Silhouette" was recorded during the Lost and Found sessions, with it later appearing on the soundtrack album to the Showtime series Masters of Horror.

Music and lyrics
Lost and Found was described as a hard rock album by Consequence of Sound. It includes elements of thrash metal. The song "Determined" (originally titled "Fucking Determined") utilizes elements of modern thrash and hardcore punk, while the song "IMN"'s lyrics revolve around suicide, a recurring theme in Mudvayne's songs. The track "Choices" was described by Gray as "the eight-minute opus". It is to date the longest Mudvayne song.

The band sees the album as a return to the raw sound heard on L.D. 50, with guitarist Greg Tribbett saying in an interview with Rolling Stone magazine "Instead of being all slick, we're definitely going for a raw sound on this record. The last one was pretty smooth and the first record, L.D. 50, was raw, so we're kind of mixing it up a little bit." Matthew McDonough said he believed the music on the album would reflect a refinement of Mudvayne's complexly structured hard rock balanced against more melody than any previous album. Bassist Ryan Martinie added, "Our goal for the third album is to make music that pleases us because if it makes us happy then the rest will take care of itself."

Many critics have claimed the album abandoned the sound from their previous albums.

Promotion
Music videos were made for all four singles: "Determined", "Happy?", "Forget to Remember" and "Fall into Sleep". The music video for "Determined" shows the band playing the song in front of a large group of moshing fans. It was recorded in New York City. "Determined" was featured on the soundtrack of the video game Need for Speed: Underground 2 while "Happy?" appeared in the video game MX vs. ATV Untamed and was also used as the theme song for WWE's Vengeance.

Reception

The album sold 100,000 copies in its first week of release.

Upon release, the album received generally mixed reviews, with Metacritic giving it a score of 46%. Some critics noted a perceived change in sound on the album aimed towards a more mainstream audience. The Kansas Wichita Eagle observed, "Success wasn't something the members of Mudvayne set out to achieve, but they won't spurn it. Since the quartet's arrival on the heavy metal scene in 1996, it has progressed from the fringes to the rock mainstream."

A positive review appeared in Entertainment Weekly, which wrote, "Weaving crystallized melodies into their signature rage clusters, the metalheads dip a toe in clearer waters without losing any of the grime."

Johnny Loftus of AllMusic praised the opening track, "Determined", writing in his review, "They nail it on opener "Determined"—one of Mudvayne's all-time strongest tracks, it's a fist-swinging blast of modernized thrash." However, he gave the album a mixed review, writing, "Lost and Found soon falls into the familiar, busting no-one-understands-me lyrics and matching moments of refreshing rawness to stretches of stereotypical 'corporate metal,' a non-genre that's risen up to accept loud rock refugees and the harder side of post-grunge. The energy in 'Determined' and 'Just' is sapped by the meandering 'TV Radio' and 'Fall into Sleep,' and ultimately Mudvayne gets lost between thrash and diluted Slipknot devotion."

Mixed reviews also appeared in Q, which said, "[Mudvayne] remain[s] spirit-crushingly average", Rolling Stone, which called the album "Syncopated sludge that will connect only with aging burnouts and the angriest of young 'uns" and Billboard, which wrote, "The album is, while not terrible, not very memorable, either."

PopMatters gave the album a negative review, writing, "Lost and Found is ultimately a pointless album, one that might have sold well six years ago, but comes across as drab and hopelessly passé today."

The song "Determined" was nominated at the 2006 Grammy Awards for Best Metal Performance but lost to Slipknot's "Before I Forget".

Impact
Demo versions of "Fall into Sleep", "Happy?" and "All That You Are", and an acoustic version of "Forget to Remember" appeared on the 2007 compilation By the People, for the People, which was compiled from selections voted for by fans through the band's website. The album versions of "Determined", "Fall into Sleep" and "Happy?" appeared on the compilation Playlist: The Very Best of Mudvayne in 2011.

Track listing

Japanese edition bonus track

Personnel
Mudvayne
 Chad Gray – lead vocals
 Greg Tribbett – guitars, backing vocals
 Ryan Martinie – bass
 Matthew McDonough – drums

Additional personnel
 Dave Fortman – recording, production, audio mixing
 Jeremy Parker – audio mixing
 Mike Boden – assistant engineer
 Mauricio Serna – assistant engineer
 Kelly Liebelt – assistant engineer
 Tony Terrebonne – assistant engineer
 Ted Jensen – mastering at Sterling Sound, New York City
 Devun Fortman – additional vocals on "Choices"
 Erinn Fortman – additional vocals on "Choices"
 Leah Germinaro – additional vocals on "Choices"

Chart positions

Singles

Certifications

References

External links
RollingStone.com: News - Mudvayne - Mudvayne Unmask on "Lost"

2005 albums
Albums produced by Dave Fortman
Mudvayne albums